Several steamships have borne the name City of Flint, after Flint, Michigan:

  was a Design 1022 steamship. She was launched in 1919 and sunk by a German submarine in 1943.
  was a Great Lakes carferry launched in 1929, decommissioned in 1967 and sold for conversion as a river ferry barge in 1969.

References

Ship names